For Her Sake may refer to:
 For Her Sake (1911 film), an American silent short war romance film
 For Her Sake (1930 film), a Swedish comedy film